Milltown,.  is a small Co. Cavan village estimated population of around 100 persons. During a nineteenth century O'Donavan townlands survey of Co. Cavan it was noted that the Milttown area was traditionally referred to as Bellanaleck (Beal Atha Na Leice - the mouth of the ford of the flagstone), there are no other records with this name.  The Archaeological Inventory of County Cavan notes (507) Derrygeeraghan , a raised circular Rath area with two substantial earthen banks and a wide deep fosse dating from earlier medieval times.    The present Milltown Electoral Division and catchment area comprises several neighboring townlands within an ancient Barony of Loughtee Lower, Co. Cavan and Drumlane Civil Parish in County Cavan, Ireland.

Milltown Village History

The earliest mention of a Milltown village land area can be found in the register of deeds dated to 1725. It refers to " that house and farm commonly known and referred to as Milltown situated in the parish of Drumlane and County of Cavan and the mill and other appurtenances there onto belonging". The mill referred to was located across the road from the present day Community Centre. Milltown is near Ardan Lough and Drumlane Lough and is known for Drumlane Monastery, a twelfth-century Augustinian St Mary priory church and round tower, located one kilometer south of the village.

Historic Ordnance Survey map references of the Milltown village area date to around 1837 and shows an RC Chapel and a National School House within the townlands of Milltown and Money (Monea). A Griffith Valuations survey of tenement dwellings was carried out in 1856/7 and shows the village predominantly formed part of the Earl Annesley estate (County Cavan's second biggest landholder). While other parts of Milltown village were under other landlords and freeholders. Later Ordnance Survey maps produced between 1888-1913 show a range of buildings including a School, Smithy (blacksmith forge), the RC Church, Parochial House and a Temperance Hall. The original parish of Drumlane RC Church in Milltown consisted of a thatched barn shaped structure described in records as a 'humble shed'. The present St Patrick's RC Church in Milltown dates from 1868 and was designed by William Hague (architect), a prominent local church architect of the period. 

At the time of the Famine in 1848, it went reported that the parish population stood at around 400 persons and there was opposition locally to the building of a Fever Hospital in the village, then built at the townland Milltown/Monea crossroads. The 1901 and 1911 census lists between 83 and 93 people living in the village. The earliest Milltown school house, within the townland of Monea dates from around 1824 and probably was multi-denominational under the original free National schools programme for children's education. In a report published in 1826 for the Commission of Irish Education Enquiry it was noted a teacher Edward Roden with forty pupils. A new school opened later in 1863 on a site bought for the local parish. By the end of the nineteenth century there were several local businesses including shops, a Wayside Inn which changed ownership several times and later became known as the Drumlane Bar.  The village was reported as having two other ale houses and included a thriving cooper & carpentry business, police barracks, a post office and several fine houses with slate roofs. The Temperance Hall opened in 1906 and grew to over 200 members, until disaster struck in 1921 when the building was destroyed maliciously by fire. A replacement hall was built in 1939 and functioned until it was demolished in 2003 to make way for a fine new Community Centre officially opened in 2005, inclusive of GFC sports grounds and space for a community garden. The dairy industry has for over a century been a significant presence within the local area. The Milltown branch creamery (now closed) operated for most of the twentieth century as a collection point for local farmers milk delivered in churns (cans) for processing at Killeshandra Co-op Creamery into butter and a range of other products. It is of particular note that local farmer Anthony Leddy (1930-2004) became national president of the Irish Creamery Milk Supplier Association (ICMSA) between 1978-1981. Noted in the Irish Times newspaper 2004 as a Quiet champion of farmers and rural communities.

Genealogy/Ancestry/Record Search
 Census 1901 and 1911 for Milltown (http://www.census.nationalarchives.ie)
 Griffith Valuations (1847-1864) for Milltown (http://www.askaboutireland.ie)
  Book - Our Sacred Spaces written locally to commemorate St Patricks (RC) Church Milltown 1868-2018 & Drumlane Abbey

Community Partnership, Sport and Recreation
The Drumlane Community Partnership CLG, registered charity aims to support the voluntary welfare and cultural needs of the local community across all denominational age groups for residents and visitors with a range of indoor and outdoors activates.

Milltown has the Drumlane GAA club with ladies, men's and juvenile teams. The club's pitch, club house and stand is located on the outskirts of the village.

References

Towns and villages in County Cavan
Townlands of County Cavan